Umme Fatema Nazma Begum (born 2 October 1972), better known as Sheuly Azad, is an entrepreneur and politician, holding one of the seats reserved for women in the 11th Jatiya Sangsad, the Bangladeshi parliament.

Early life 
Sheuly was born in the Muslim family of West Kuttapara in Sarail Upazila of Brahmanbaria district. Her father is a Businessman and mother is a housewife.

Politics career 
After the tragic killing of her husband, Sheuly Azad entered politics, suppressing the pain of her bereavement. The Sarail Awami League committee was dissolved and Sheuly Azad was elected joint convener-1 of the upazila unit. Since then, Sheuly Azad has been relentlessly working with a view to materializing the dreams of her late husband. Local leaders and activists of the Awami League and its front organizations got united under the leadership of Sheuly Azad.

References

Awami League politicians
Living people
1972 births
11th Jatiya Sangsad members
Bangladeshi women in politics
People from Sarail Upazila
20th-century Bengalis
21st-century Bengalis
21st-century Bangladeshi women politicians
Women members of the Jatiya Sangsad